Chaenopsis alepidota, the orangethroat pikeblenny, is a species of chaenopsid blenny found in the eastern Pacific Ocean from California to the Gulf of California. It lives in holes excavated by worms in sandy areas. Some notable distinguishing physical characteristics of the species within the Chaenopsis family are the number of dark lateral blotches and the main body color. The Chaenopsis Alepidota species in particular has 11 blotches and has a pale and light green main body color.

References

External links
 

Fish described in 1890
alepidota
Taxobox binomials not recognized by IUCN